Jarocki a surname. Notable people with the surname include:

Feliks Paweł Jarocki (1790–1865), Polish zoologist and entomologist
Jerzy Jarocki (1929–2012), Polish theatre director, translator, playwright and academic
Władysław Jarocki (1879–1965), Polish explorer and painter